Masakatsu (written: , , , , , , , ,  or ) is a masculine Japanese given name. Notable people with the name include:

, Japanese samurai
, Japanese astronomer
, Japanese ski jumper
, Japanese mixed martial artist and professional wrestler
, Japanese academic
, Japanese daimyō
, Japanese rugby sevens player
, Japanese daimyō
, Japanese sumo wrestler
Masakatsu Iwamoto, Japanese artist
, Japanese politician
, Japanese sumo wrestler
, Japanese footballer and manager
, Japanese activist
, Japanese footballer
, Japanese chemist
, Japanese musician
, Japanese mixed martial artist
, Japanese samurai
, Japanese rower
, Japanese samurai

See also
8503 Masakatsu, a main-belt asteroid

Japanese masculine given names